The Bull and Crown is a Grade II listed former public house, now restaurant, at The Green, Chingford, London E4.

It was built in 1898.

In December 2012, after a £500,000 redevelopment, it re-opened as a branch of the Prezzo restaurant chain.

References

Grade II listed buildings in the London Borough of Waltham Forest
Former pubs in London
Chingford
Buildings and structures completed in 1898
19th-century architecture in the United Kingdom
Grade II listed pubs in London
Pubs in the London Borough of Waltham Forest